Kyi Soe Tun (born 9 December 1945) is a five-time Myanmar Academy Award winning film director, producer and screenwriter of Burmese cinema. He served as the chairman of the Myanmar Motion Picture Organization.

Biography
Kyi Soe Tun is the son of Daw Hla and her husband U Tun  in Yangon. He received a Bachelor of Science degree from Yangon University. He began his film career in 1977, and first served as director in 1980 in the film Chan Myay Pa Say.He won five national awards
Academy.

Filmography
Kyi Soe Tun's films include:
 Sone Yay or Downstream (1990)
 San Yay or Upstream, about a boy who is raised in a monastery after he is abandoned by his parents. Searching for them, he discovers Buddhism.
 Thu Kyun Ma Khan Bi or Never Shall We Be Enslaved (1997) is about the last king of Burma, Thibaw Min. British and French colonialists interfere in the internal affairs of the Burmese kingdom which leads to its destruction and a subsequent revolt to regain independence. (See also History of Myanmar.)
 Sacrificial Heart (2004) is a drama set in the Pagan Kingdom. In 1074, King Anawrahta sent his son, General Kyansittha to help the Mon people overcome invaders. Kyanzittha fell in love with the Mon king's wife, thus beginning a love triangle amidst the war.
 True Love (2005) is about a romance between a Japanese man and a young Burmese woman.
 Hexagon (2006) is a comedy about six pregnant women who are very optimistic about the future of their children to be.

References
 Rithdee, Kong. August 11, 2006. "Cultural Exchange," Realtime, page 1, The Bangkok Post (print edition).

External links

Interview

1945 births
Living people
Burmese film directors
Burmese film producers
University of Yangon alumni
Recipients of the Order of the Union of Myanmar
People from Yangon